2013 saw the 29th edition of the Sri Lanka Football Premier League. This season featured 20 teams, an expansion of eight clubs, split into two groups of 10. The top four sides at the end of a round robin entered the final phase.

The tournament was won by Air Force SC. Ratnam Sports Club were the defending champions, but were knocked out in the quarterfinals.

Group A

Group B

Final stage

Bracket

Quarter-finals

Semi-finals

Final

References
Standings at FIFA.com (archived 19 August 2007)
Island.lk 
Season at soccerway.com

Sri Lanka Football Premier League seasons
1
Sri Lanka
1
Sri Lanka